Carolina Cadillac Company Building, also known as Adamson Cadillac Co., Adamson-Cadillac-Olds. Co., and Black Cadillac-Olds., Inc., is a historic car dealership building located at Greensboro, Guilford County, North Carolina. It was built in 1922, and is a two-story, three bay, rectangular brick commercial building with Mission Revival style embellishments. A one-story brick addition was added in 1940. The front facade features an original, decorative, metal awning over the entrance and a central shaped pediment topped with terra cotta coping.

It was listed on the National Register of Historic Places in 2014.

References

Cadillac
Commercial buildings on the National Register of Historic Places in North Carolina
Mission Revival architecture in North Carolina
Commercial buildings completed in 1922
Buildings and structures in Greensboro, North Carolina
National Register of Historic Places in Guilford County, North Carolina